U.S. Route 52 (US 52) skirts the western fringes of the U.S. state of West Virginia. It runs from the Virginia state line near Bluefield, where it is concurrent with Interstate 77 (I-77), in a general northwest and north direction to I-64 at Kenova. There it turns east, overlapping I-64 for  before splitting off onto the West Huntington Expressway into Ohio via the West Huntington Bridge. Despite having an even number, US 52 is signed north–south in West Virginia. In some other states along its route, it is signed east-west. The West Virginia segment is signed such that US 52 north corresponds to the general westward direction of the highway, and vice versa. For a while, US 52 parallels US 23, which is on the other side of the Big Sandy River in Kentucky. This continues into Ohio, where US 52 travels on the Ohio side of the Ohio River while US 23 travels on the Kentucky side.

Most of the route is being upgraded to a high-speed four-lane divided highway, but not to interstate standards. It has been designated as part of the I-73 and I-74 corridors. From I-77 south of Bluefield to near Williamson, the new highway has been referenced to as the King Coal Highway; from Williamson north to Kenova, it is the Tolsia Highway.

History

West Huntington Expressway
The West Huntington Expressway is a controlled-access elevated highway that crosses the west end of Huntington WV. It was constructed in 1965 and originally signed as West Virginia Route 94 (WV 94). The first segment to open was a stub from I-64 to Jefferson Avenue in West Huntington in the fall of 1965. This included a bridge over a CSX railroad mainline. In the early 1970s, the expressway was extended northward across what is now the Nick Joe Rahall II Bridge across the Ohio River to US 52 and State Route 7 in Ohio.

Tolls were collected at the Ohio River bridge until the mid-1980s. The expressway has four lanes from I-64 to the US 60 interchange, where it drops to two lanes for the remainder of the highway, which includes the Ohio River bridge. The expressway was renumbered US 52 in 1979 when that highway was re-routed out of downtown Huntington to a new alignment on I-64 west to the Tolsia Highway south of Kenova.

Tolsia Highway

The Tolsia Highway is defined as running from I-64 at Kenova to Corridor G (US 119) north of Williamson. The name Tolsia takes the names from the first initials of the Tug, Ohio, Levisa, and Sandy Improvement Association. In the mid-1960s, state funding was secured to upgrade most of County Route 1 (CR 1), which ran along the Big Sandy River and Tug Fork River. The upgraded CR 1 and CR 29 was renumbered as US 52 in 1979.

Portions of the  highway have been upgraded to four lanes. In 1998, US 52 south of the I-64 interchange in Kenova was upgraded to four-lane highway standards to the access road for Tri-State Airport. In that same year, the Prichard bypass was opened to traffic with one interchange and one at-grade intersection. This  bypass includes very large rock cuts and a long and winding grade down a hill. The extension was completed in 2002 at a cost of $9.6 million.

In 2001, the Crum segment of the Tolsia Highway opened to traffic. The highway begins just north of Crum at an incomplete diamond interchange and heads eastward towards CR 2. It has at-grade intersections with CR 52-47 and CR 52-31 along with a side road at the eastern terminus that takes traffic to CR 2. There are stubs for future bridges and ramps. Signage along this segment is minimal, with only a handful of arrows to designate the route. While the highway was built to four-lane standards, it is only striped for two.

In late 2002, Senator Robert C. Byrd received $20 million in funds to jump-start construction on the northern half of the Tolsia Highway. The money would be used to speed up construction on the  link between Huntington and Prichard, serving several industrial parks and relieving two-lane US 52 of coal-truck congestion.

Plans include an interchange and five bridge structures.

Williamson Bypass

US 52 enters Kentucky twice along the Williamson, West Virginia bypass; bridging the Tug Fork River was preferred because it prevented the blasting of several hillsides in West Virginia. It was completed in 1996 as part of the Corridor G (US 119) project.

Future

The Tolsia Highway is expected to meet the King Coal Highway at WV 65 and Corridor G (US 119).

King Coal Highway
The King Coal Highway is defined to run from WV 65 and Corridor G (US 119) near Belo, West Virginia, to I-77 at its US 52 interchange near Bluefield. The Coalfields Expressway (US 121) and the Shawnee Expressway will connect to the King Coal Highway.

The travel time, currently over 120 minutes from Williamson to Bluefield, will be reduced to 87 minutes. South of Ikes Fork, a two-hour trip to Bluefield will be reduced to 44 minutes.

Interchanges and intersections proposed for the King Coal Highway include:

 Mingo County:
 Near Head of Isaban
 Near Taylorville, West Virginia
 Near Twisted Gun Gap, West Virginia
 Near Delbarton
 Near Sharon Heights
 Logan County:
 Horsepen Mountain at Mountain View
 McDowell County:
 Johnny Cake Mountain
 Sandy Huff
 Davy
 Welch at Indian Ridge
 Carswell Hollow near Kimball
 Burke Mountain near Keystone
 Near Crumpler
 Near the head of Long Pole
 Near the head of Isaban
 Wyoming County:
 Indian Ridge near Steeles
 Near Fanrock and Bailysville at Davy Mountain on Indian Ridge
 Near Head of North Springs
 Head of Burke Mountain near Herndon
 Mercer County:
 Near Crystal
 Near McComas
 Near Sandlick
 West Virginia Route 20 near Littlesburgh Road
 Near Rock
 Near Godfrey
 West Virginia Route 123 - Airport Road
 John Nash Boulevard

 Construction began in 1999 on the three-level diamond interchange on Indian Ridge near Welch that will facilitate traffic between the King Coal Highway (US 52, Interstate 73/74) and the Coalfields Expressway (US 121). Initial site work was completed in 2003, with grading evident; this required the filling in of a large valley. It will also be the site of a new state prison along with future industrial development.

Work has progressed on the four-lane upgrading of US 52 in Mercer County just east of Bluefield. Six buildings will be demolished. This is the first of several projects that will extend the King Coal Highway to West Virginia Route 123 (Airport Road) north of Bluefield. Extending this project east, another contract was awarded December 15 and totals $1,371,251. A future contract will include a bridge over US 19 which will cost $15 million.

Design work is being commenced on a  segment of the King Coal Highway from Horsepen Mountain to Isaban and from the Mercer County Interchange to West Virginia Route 123/Airport Road. The work being done on a  section of highway near Horsepen Mountain is being done by mining companies that will save taxpayers over $20 million.

The total cost for both the Tolsia and King Coal Highways will be over $2 billion.

Major intersections

References

External links

52
 West Virginia
Interstate 73
Interstate 74
Transportation in Mercer County, West Virginia
Transportation in McDowell County, West Virginia
Transportation in Wyoming County, West Virginia
Transportation in Mingo County, West Virginia
Transportation in Pike County, Kentucky
Transportation in Wayne County, West Virginia
Transportation in Cabell County, West Virginia